Mollweide may refer to:

Karl Mollweide, mathematician (1774-1825).
Mollweide projection, a pseudocylindrical map projection.
Mollweide Glacier, a glacier the Victoria region of Antarctica.
Mollweide's formula, a mathematical equation.